Anasol is the third album by Colombian pop singer Anasol.

The album was released on August 30, 2005. The album contains 12 songs, including her first hit single "Sentimiento", which reached number 31 on the Billboard Hot Latin Songs chart.

Track listing
All songs written by Anasol Escobar, except where noted.
"Sentimiento" – 4:18
"Nace" – 3:57
"Sube el Alma" (Escobar, Luis Fernando Ochoa) – 3:30
"Dame" (Escobar, Ochoa) – 3:28
"Sin Miedo a Caer" (Escobar, Ochoa) – 3:40
"Amantes Invisibles" (Escobar, Ochoa) – 4:17
"Voy Volando" – 3:36
"Buscame" (Escobar, Ochoa) – 3:36
"Siluetas" – 3:11
"Astros" – 3:17
"Si No Llego" (Escobar, Ochoa) – 3:54
"Sentimiento" (Club Mix) – 7:51

References

2005 albums
Anasol albums
Universal Music Group albums